The Senate Square presents Carl Ludvig Engel's architecture as a unique allegory of political, religious, scientific and commercial powers in the centre of Helsinki, Finland.

Senate Square and its surroundings make up the oldest part of central Helsinki.

Construction

In the 17th and 18th centuries it was the location of a graveyard. In 1812 Senate Square was designated as the main square for the new capital of Helsinki in the city plan designed by Johan Albrecht Ehrenström. The Palace of the Council of State (or Government Palace) was completed on the eastern side of the Senate Square in 1822. It served as the seat of the Senate of Finland until it was replaced by the Council of State in 1918, and now houses the offices of the Prime Minister of Finland and the cabinet.
The main University building, on the opposite side of the Senate Square, was constructed in 1832.

The Helsinki Cathedral on the northern edge of the Senate Square was Engel's lengthiest architectural project. He worked on it from 1818 until his death in 1840. The Helsinki Cathedral — then called the Church of St. Nicholas — dominates the Senate Square, and was finalized twelve years afters Engel's death, in 1852.

Statue of Alexander II

A statue of Emperor Alexander II is located in the center of the square. The statue, erected in 1894, was built to commemorate his re-establishment of the Diet of Finland in 1863 as well as his initiation of several reforms that increased Finland's autonomy from Russia. The statue comprises Alexander on a pedestal surrounded by figures representing law, culture, and peasants. The sculptor was Walter Runeberg.

During the Russification of Finland from 1899 onwards, the statue became a symbol of quiet resistance, with people protesting against the decrees of Nicholas II by leaving flowers at the foot of the statue of his grandfather, then known in Finland as "the good tsar".

After Finland's independence in 1917, demands were made to remove the statue. Later, it was suggested to replace it with the equestrian statue of Mannerheim currently located on Mannerheimintie in front of the Kiasma museum. Nothing came of either of these suggestions, and today the statue is one of the major tourist landmarks of the city and a reminder of Finland's close relationship with Imperial Russia.

Contemporary role
Today, the Senate Square is one of the main tourist attractions of Helsinki. Various art happenings, ranging from concerts to snow buildings to controversial snow board happenings, have been set up on the Senate Square. In Autumn 2010 a United Buddy Bears exhibition with 142 bears was displayed on the historic square.

Digital carillon music is played daily at 17:49 at the Senate Square. The sound installation was composed by Harri Viitanen, composer and organist of Helsinki Cathedral, and Jyrki Alakuijala, Doctor of Technology. The optimal listening position is at the proximity of the square's central monument, the bronze statue of Alexander II.

Several buildings near the Senate Square are managed by the government real estate provider, Senate Properties. At the northwest corner there are four short pillars erected each winter to protect the memorial plate of the Ulrika Eleonora church from snow plows.

The site aspires to get on the World Heritage Site but a single building in its southwest corner prevents it.

In popular culture

Film
 American actor and film director Warren Beatty filmed scenes from his film Reds (1981) on the square — Helsinki playing the role of St. Peterburg — but without showing the cathedral.
 The title sequence of John Huston's The Kremlin Letter (1970) was filmed over the square at night, including the silhouette of the cathedral.
 Snowy night scenes from Jim Jarmusch's film Night on Earth (1991) were filmed on the square, but given the impression that there is a traffic roundabout at the center.

Music
 The opening sequence of the music video for "Sandstorm" by Darude was filmed on Senate Square, prominently featuring the cathedral in the background.

References

External links
 

Squares in Helsinki
Neoclassical architecture in Finland
National squares
Kruununhaka